Rosalie Thomass (born 14 August 1987 in Munich) is a German actress.  She has appeared in several television shows and films.

Filmography 
 2011: 
 2012:  (TV film)
 2012:  (TV film)
 2014:  (TV film)
 2015: 
 2015: The Dog Wedding
 2016: Greetings from Fukushima
 2016: 
 2017: Lobbyistin

External links

21st-century German actresses
German film actresses
German television actresses
Living people
1987 births